Ed Hime is a British screenwriter and playwright, best known for his work with the BBC science fiction television series Doctor Who.

Career
Hime has written several plays, such as Small Hours (at Hampstead Theatre), as well London Falls and London Tongue at the Old Red Lion Theatre. He also worked in radio, winning the 2007 Prix Italia award for Best Original Radio Drama for his radio play, The Incomplete Recorded Works of a Dead Body.

On television, Hime has written for the fourth and fifth series of the teen drama Skins. Hime was attached to work on a new series of Sapphire & Steel with Luther creator Neil Cross. However, the project was never produced.

In 2018, he wrote the ninth and penultimate episode of the eleventh series of Doctor Who, It Takes You Away. He returned to write the third episode of the twelfth series, Orphan 55. He co-wrote the seventh episode of The Watch, which is inspired by the Ankh-Morpork City Watch from the Discworld series of fantasy novels by Terry Pratchett. He wrote three of the eight episodes  of Lockwood & Co., the Netflix series about teenage ghost hunters released in 2023.

Filmography

References

External links
 

Living people
21st-century British male writers
British television writers
British male screenwriters
British science fiction writers
English dramatists and playwrights
English male dramatists and playwrights
Year of birth missing (living people)